Spectrum is a bus rapid transit station on the Mississauga Transitway in Mississauga, Ontario, Canada. It is located along the north side of Eglinton Avenue at Spectrum Way.

Spectrum and Orbitor opened on 1 May 2017.

References

External links

 flickr search for: Mississauga Transitway Spectrum

Mississauga Transitway
2017 establishments in Ontario